Icefall Nunatak is a nunatak  north of Mount Watt in the Barker Range of Victoria Land, Antarctica. The nunatak was visited in 1981–82 by Bradley Field, a geologist with the New Zealand Geological Survey, who suggested the name from the impressive icefalls that drop off at either side of the feature. The topographical feature lies situated on the Pennell Coast, a portion of Antarctica lying between Cape Williams and Cape Adare.

References

Nunataks of Victoria Land
Pennell Coast